Sandra Ioane (née Wihongi, b. 12 February 1961) is a former rugby union player. She made her debut for the Black Ferns at the RugbyFest 1990 against the Netherlands, she played in the first and third matches. She was one of two women who were unable to make the 1991 World Cup.

Personal life 
Ioane is married to former Samoan international Eddie Ioane. She is the mother of Akira and Rieko Ioane, both have represented New Zealand internationally in the Māori All Blacks, Sevens and in the All Blacks. She has a Master's degree in Sports Marketing and is currently the club manager at Ponsonby.

References

External links 
 Black Ferns Profile

1961 births
Living people
New Zealand female rugby union players
New Zealand women's international rugby union players
Rugby union locks
New Zealand Māori rugby union players
New Zealand expatriates in Japan
Rugby union players from Auckland
People from Kaikohe
Rugby union players from the Northland Region